Proto-Indo-Iranian, also Proto-Indo-Iranic is the reconstructed proto-language of the Indo-Iranian/Indo-Iranic branch of Indo-European. Its speakers, the hypothetical Proto-Indo-Iranians,  are assumed to have lived in the late 3rd millennium BC, and are often connected with the Sintashta culture of the Eurasian Steppe and the early Andronovo archaeological horizon.

Proto-Indo-Iranian was a satem language, likely removed less than a millennium from its ancestor, the late Proto-Indo-European language, and in turn removed less than a millennium from the Avestan and Vedic Sanskrit of the Rigveda, its descendants. 

Proto-Indo-Iranian has been considered to form a subgroup along with Greek, Armenian and Phrygian on the basis of many striking similarities in the morphological structure. However, this issue remains unsettled.

It is the ancestor of the Indo-Aryan languages, the Iranian languages, and the Nuristani languages.

Descriptive phonology

In addition to the vowels, and  could function as the syllabic core.

Two palatal series
Proto-Indo-Iranian is hypothesized to have contained two series of stops or affricates in the palatal to postalveolar region. The phonetic nature of this contrast is not clear, and hence they are usually referred to as the primary or first series (*ć *ȷ́ *ȷ́ʰ (also represented as *ĉ, *ĵ, *ĵʰ), continuing Proto-Indo-European palatovelar *ḱ *ǵ *ǵʰ) and the second or secondary series (*č *ǰ *ǰʰ, continuing Proto-Indo-European plain and labialized velars, *k, *g, *gʰ and *kʷ, *gʷ, *gʷʰ, in palatalizing contexts).
The following table shows the most common reflexes of the two series (Proto-Iranian is the hypothetical ancestor to the Iranian languages, including Avestan and Old Persian):

Laryngeal
Proto-Indo-European is usually hypothesized to have had three to four laryngeal consonants, each of which could occur in either syllabic or non-syllabic positions. In Proto-Indo-Iranian, the laryngeals merged as one phoneme /*H/. Beekes suggests that some instances of this /*H/ survived into Rigvedic Sanskrit and Avestan as unwritten glottal stops as evidenced by metrics.

Accent
Like Proto-Indo-European and Vedic Sanskrit (and also Avestan, though it was not written down), Proto-Indo-Iranian had a pitch accent system similar to present-day Japanese, conventionally indicated by an acute accent over the accented vowel.

Historical phonology
The most distinctive phonological change separating Proto-Indo-Iranian from Proto-Indo-European is the collapse of the ablauting vowels *e, *o into a single vowel, Proto-Indo-Iranian *a (but see Brugmann's law). Grassmann's law, Bartholomae's law, and the Ruki sound law were also complete in Proto-Indo-Iranian.

A fuller list of some of the hypothesized sound changes from Proto-Indo-European to Proto-Indo-Iranian follows:

 The Satem shift, consisting of two sets of related changes.  The PIE palatals *ḱ *ǵ *ǵʰ are fronted or affricated, eventually resulting in PII *ć, *ȷ́, *ȷ́ʰ, while the PIE labiovelars *kʷ *gʷ *gʷʰ merge with the velars *k *g *gʰ.

 Bartholomae's law: an aspirate immediately followed by a voiceless consonant becomes voiced stop + voiced aspirate.  In addition, dʰ + t > dᶻdʰ.

 The Ruki rule: *s is retracted to *š when immediately following  a liquid (*r *r̥ *l *l̥), a high vowel (*i *u), a PIE velar (*ḱ *ǵ *ǵʰ *k *g *gʰ *kʷ *gʷ *gʷʰ) or the syllabic laryngeal *H̥. Its allophone *z likewise becomes *ž.

 Before a dental occlusive, *ĉ becomes *š and *ĵ becomes *ž.  *ĵʰ also becomes *ž, with aspiration of the occlusive.

 The sequence *ĉš was simplified to *šš.

 The "second palatalization" or "law of palatals": *k *g *gʰ develop palatal allophones *č *ǰ *ǰʰ before the front vowels *i, *e. through an intermediate *kʲ *gʲ *gʲʰ.

 Brugmann's law: *o in an open syllable lengthens to *ō.

 The vowels *e *o merge with *a.  Similarly, *ē, *ō merge with *ā.  This has the effect of giving full phonemic status to the second palatal series *č *ǰ *ǰʰ.

 In certain positions, laryngeals were vocalized to *i.  This preceded the second palatalization.
 Following a consonant, and preceding a consonant cluster

 Following a consonant and word-final

 The Indo-European laryngeals all merged into one phoneme *H, which may have been a glottal stop. This was probably contemporary with the merging of *e and *o with *a.

 According to Lubotsky's Law, *H disappeared when followed by a voiced nonaspirated stop and another consonant:

Subsequent sound changes
Among the sound changes from Proto-Indo-Iranian to Indo-Aryan is the loss of the voiced sibilant *z; among those to Proto-Iranian is the de-aspiration of the PIE voiced aspirates.

Morphology 
Proto-Indo-Iranian has preserved much of the morphology of Proto-Indo-European: thematic and athematic inflection in both nouns and verbs, all three numbers of singular, dual and plural, all the tense, mood and voice categories in the verb, and the cases in the noun.

An important innovation in the noun is the creation of a genitive plural ending *-nām used with vowel stems. In verbs, the chief innovation is the creation of a passive conjugation with the suffix *-yá, with middle inflection.

See also
Substratum in the Vedic language

References

Bibliography
 
 
 
 
Alexander Lubotsky, "The Indo-Iranian substratum" in Early Contacts between Uralic and Indo-European, ed. Carpelan et al., Helsinki (2001).
Asko Parpola, 'The formation of the Aryan branch of Indo-European', in Blench and Spriggs (eds), Archaeology and Language III, London and New York (1999).

External links

Indo-Iranian
Indo-Iranian languages
Indo-Iranian